Historic Crew Stadium, previously known as Columbus Crew Stadium and Mapfre Stadium, is a soccer-specific stadium in Columbus, Ohio, United States. It primarily served as the home stadium of the Columbus Crew of Major League Soccer from 1999 until 2021, when the team moved to Lower.com Field. The Historic Crew Stadium is the current home of the Crew's training facility, the OhioHealth Performance Center and MLS Next Pro team Columbus Crew 2. Historic Crew Stadium is also the site of a variety of additional events in amateur and professional soccer, American football, lacrosse, and rugby, and is a regular site for outdoor concerts due to the permanent stage in the north end zone.

Built in 1999, it was the first soccer-specific stadium built by a Major League Soccer team, starting an important trend in MLS stadium construction. The stadium was named for Madrid-based Mapfre Insurance after the company signed a 5-year sponsorship agreement announced on March 3, 2015. In December 2020, the deal expired and the Crew renamed the stadium. The listed seating capacity is 19,968. In 2015, Mapfre Stadium and Director of Grounds Weston Appelfeller were honored with the prestigious Field of the Year award by the Sports Turf Managers Association (STMA) for the professional soccer division.

History
The Crew played their first three seasons at Ohio Stadium on the campus of the Ohio State University. During games, large sections of the stadium were blocked off to reduce capacity from approximately 90,000 to 25,243. Although the Crew enjoyed success at Ohio Stadium during their tenure there, the large seating capacity and limitations to the field size made the stadium ill-suited for soccer.  Additionally, Ohio Stadium then required rented lights for night matches. These problems, along with planned renovations to Ohio Stadium, which began in 1999, were all factors in the development of Historic Crew Stadium. The construction cost of US$28.5 million was covered entirely with private funds from Crew owner and oil billionaire Lamar Hunt and his Hunt Sports group. It is located on the grounds of the Ohio Expo Center and State Fairgrounds, between East 17th Avenue and East Hudson Street. The site was previously home to Columbus Auto Parts, an OEM factory supplying the automobile industry, which stood vacant for decades between the Conrail railroad tracks and Interstate 71 before its demolition in the '90s.

Historic Crew Stadium opened on May 15, 1999, as Columbus Crew Stadium with a match between the home side and the New England Revolution. It is the second soccer-specific stadium built in the country, after Steel Athletic Field was built in Bethlehem, Pennsylvania in 1913, and the first Major League Soccer stadium constructed in the United States. It has been credited with inspiring the wave of construction of soccer-specific stadiums throughout the league. In the 2010 Showcase issue of Stadia Magazine, Ian Nuttall stated "Who'd have thought when it opened in 1999 that Major League Soccer's first purpose-built stadium would kick-start the wave of dedicated soccer-specific stadiums that continue today?" The seating capacity was originally 22,555 until 2008 when construction of a permanent stage in the north end zone reduced seating capacity to 20,455, with room to expand to 30,000 total seats for concerts. The current seating capacity for a soccer game is 19,968.

After nearly 15 years of the stadium not having a corporate sponsor, the Crew announced naming rights were sold to Madrid-based insurance company Mapfre on March 3, 2015. The team had been searching to sell stadium naming rights since it opened in 1999, but had been unable to come to an agreement. Mapfre maintains an office in Columbus and has its U.S. base in Boston.

Events
In addition to hosting the Crew SC home games, Historic Crew Stadium has also hosted other Major League Soccer and professional soccer events. It was the site of the 2001 MLS Cup championship and was the host stadium for the Major League Soccer All-Star Game in 2000 and 2005. The stadium also hosted the U.S. Open Cup final on two occasions, in 1999 and 2002.

Both the United States men's and women's national teams have played numerous matches at Historic Crew Stadium, most notably, the 2002 FIFA World Cup qualifier in February 2001 between the U.S. and Mexico known as La Guerra Fria (The Cold War) due to sub-freezing temperatures. During the 2003 Women's World Cup, the stadium was one of the venues used during the group stage of the tournament. In 2018, Mapfre Stadium was one of three sites selected to host the SheBelieves Cup.

Historic Crew Stadium has also hosted events outside of professional soccer. The NCAA Division I Men's Soccer Championship was held at Crew Stadium in 2001 and 2003. In 2002, it hosted the Steinfeld Cup, the championship game of Major League Lacrosse. In June 2010, Historic Crew Stadium hosted the inaugural USA Sevens Rugby Collegiate Championship Invitational.

The venue was a regular site for Ohio High School Athletic Association state championship tournaments in soccer. In the local Columbus area, it is the site for the annual Westerville Football Classic, featuring the Westerville Central, Westerville North, Westerville South, and New Albany football teams. It has also been host to the local high school football rivalry of parochial schools Bishop Watterson High School and St. Francis DeSales High School.

International soccer

2003 FIFA Women's World Cup
The 2003 FIFA Women's World Cup was played in the United States. Historic Crew Stadium hosted several group game matches.

U.S. women's national soccer team

U.S. men's national soccer team

Since the opening of Historic Crew Stadium, it has been a regular site for the United States men's national soccer team matches, hosting ten games through 2013. The men's national team held an unbeaten record of 8–3–0 in all competitions, outscoring opponents 19–1. This was until the U.S. was beaten by Mexico on Veterans Day 2016.

The stadium has hosted five consecutive World Cup qualifying matches against Mexico, with the U.S. winning four of the five matches by the same score of 2–0 (with the U.S. fans adopting the rallying cry of dos-a-cero).

The national team was beaten by Mexico on November 11, 2016, by a score of 1–2, prompting Mexico's first ever win in Columbus, and the U.S.'s first World Cup qualifying defeat on home soil in 15 years. It hosted a 2018 FIFA World Cup qualifying match against Guatemala on March 29, 2016, which the US won, 4–0.

MLS Cup Finals
Since the opening of Historic Crew Stadium, it has hosted three MLS Cup Finals, once as a neutral site, and twice as home side Columbus Crew SC played host. The latter two occurred following a 2012 MLS rules change which did away with a neutral site for the Final, and instead has the club with the best overall regular-season record hosting the match.

Concerts
The stadium hosts numerous concerts annually, most notably Rock on the Range, an annual festival of performances by rock bands that was held from 2007 to 2018, and replaced by Sonic Temple Art & Music Festival in 2019. Concerts by Rascal Flatts also closed out the Ohio State Fair in 2006, 2007, and 2009. A permanent stage, built in 2008, was constructed in the north end of the stadium to accommodate concerts after the closing of Germain Amphitheater. The addition replaced about 2,100 seats in the north end.

Post-Crew

As part of the new ownership proposal for the Crew unveiled in 2018, the club announced plans to build a new stadium, eventually known as Lower.com Field, west of the Arena District near Downtown Columbus. At the time of the proposal, the new stadium would seat 20,000 spectators and include 30 suites and 1,900 club seats. Construction on the new stadium began in October 2019. With the new stadium having opened on July 3, 2021, Historic Crew Stadium was to be redeveloped into the Crew's training center and community sports park, as well as a concert venue. The OhioHealth Performance Center training facility opened in June 2021, but the stadium still remains.

In 2020, a new authority will own Historic Crew Stadium and its adjacent city sports park, with the team continuing to control the stadium in terms of its use as a practice facility and their second-level team. The Crew played their final game at Historic Crew Stadium against the Chicago Fire FC, winning 2–0.

Starting in the 2022 season, the Crew's second-level squad, Columbus Crew 2, play in the stadium, with the first game on April 15, 2022, against Orlando City B.

Notes
 The stadium features a 384 ft² (36 m²) video board as well as 32 ft (10 m) of scrolling matrix board.
 It took 274 days from groundbreaking to the inaugural game (9 months, 1 day).
 The stadium facade is 48 ft (15 m) and its bleachers reach a height of  Historic Crew stadium is built on a 15-acre (61,000 m²) site.
 The first goal was scored by Jeff Cunningham during the inaugural game.
 The April 27, 2013, match against D.C. United at the stadium was delayed by 50 minutes after a fire broke out in a speaker cabinet on the south scoreboard. Firefighters controlled the blaze immediately, and the match went on as scheduled.

References

External links

2003 FIFA Women's World Cup stadiums
CONCACAF Gold Cup stadiums
Former Major League Lacrosse venues
Former Major League Soccer stadiums
Rugby union stadiums in Columbus, Ohio
Lacrosse venues in the United States
Soccer venues in Ohio
Sports venues in Columbus, Ohio
Columbus Crew
High school football venues in Ohio
1999 establishments in Ohio
Sports venues completed in 1999
University District (Columbus, Ohio)
Premier Lacrosse League venues